David C. Schmittlein (born 1955) is an American academic administrator serving as the John C Head III Dean and Professor of Marketing at the MIT Sloan School of Management. He was appointed on August 27, 2007. Prior to joining MIT, Schmittlein was the Ira A. Lipman Professor and Professor of Marketing at the Wharton School of the University of Pennsylvania.

Education 
Schmittlein is a native of  Northampton, Massachusetts. He earned an AB in mathematics from Brown University in 1977 and received his M.Phil. and Ph.D. in business from Columbia Business School in 1979 and 1980, respectively.

Career 
Schmittlein was formerly a professor of marketing at the Wharton School of the University of Pennsylvania and chair of the editorial board for Wharton School Publishing. He joined MIT in 2007 as the first dean of the Sloan School of Management since 1966 to be recruited from outside the university.

In 2015, Schmittlein joined the board of CIGNEX Datamatics, an open-source software company based in Santa Clara, California.

References

1950s births
Brown University alumni
Living people
Columbia Business School alumni
Business school deans
MIT Sloan School of Management faculty